The South African Medical Research Council (SAMRC) is a para-statal medical research organisation in South Africa. The current president is professor Glenda Gray. The South African Medical Research Council was established in 1969 to act as an independent statutory body to co-ordinate health and medical research activities throughout South Africa.

Research conducted by the SAMRC is in the fields of tuberculosis, HIV/AIDS, cardiovascular diseases, non-communicable diseases, gender and health, alcohol abuse, and drug abuse.

It is a member of the Innovative Vector Control Consortium.

References

Medical research institutes in South Africa